KJEO-LD (channel 32) is a low-power television station in Fresno, California, United States, affiliated with the Spanish-language Nuestra Visión network. It is owned by Cocola Broadcasting. Until late 2007, KJEO-LD was also seen on KBID-LP channel 31.

History

The station was first established in 1998 as KMCF-LP.

In 2000, Cocola Broadcasting acquired the call letters KJEO-LP for channel 32, after Fresno's CBS affiliate discarded those calls in favor of KGPE. This call sign was changed to KJEO-LD in September 2009.

Technical information

Subchannels
The station's digital signal is multiplexed:

 KJEO-LD broadcasts from the Corlew Meadows ("Meadow Lakes") towers location near Auberry, CA (37.073838 -119.432075).
Older, Fresno-area-based terrestrial tuners may/may not receive the Channel 32 broadcast(s). Sensitive terrestrial tuners may reduce tropospheric propagation effects through lowering floor noise, and inadvertently mask one lower-power channel set (i.e. KJEO-LD) and enhance another (i.e. KSDI-LD).

References

External links

www.cocolatv.com

JEO-LD
Television channels and stations established in 1998
Low-power television stations in the United States